Ruination may refer to:
Ruination (Transformers), a Transformers character
Ruination (album), 2009 album by Job for a Cowboy